Monstereo Delicio is a rock album by Australian all-girl group, Girl Monstar, which was released in July 1992 via Timberyard Records. Its name references the tropical flowering plant, Monstera deliciosa, or fruit salad plant. The album was recorded by the line-up of Damian Child on bass guitar and backing vocals; Anne McCue on lead guitar, lead vocals and piano; Sherry Valier (a.k.a. Sherry Rich) on guitar, lead vocals and harmonica; and Susie World on drums, percussion and backing vocals. Prior to its release Child was replaced by Janene Abbott, who appears on the cover art but did not provide any recorded material. Tracks 1 to 10 were co-produced by Paul Kosky and Darren McCormack (a.k.a. Jedd Starr). Their earlier single, "Joe Cool", had been released in June 1990 and, with its B-side, provides two bonus tracks on this album.

Track listing

Personnel

Girl Monstar
 Sherry Valier: guitar, lead vocals (tracks 1, 2, 4, 5, 7, 9, 11), harmonica
 Anne McCue: guitars (lead, acoustic, slide), lead vocals (tracks 3, 6, 8, 12), piano
 Susie World: drums, percussion, backing vocals, lead vocals (track 10)
 Damian Child: bass (played bass on all tracks)
 Janene Abbott: bass (did not play on this album)

Miscellaneous

Original bass player, Damian Child, recorded all bass parts on the album – though her replacement Janene Abbott appears on the cover art. Monstereo Delicio first ten tracks were recorded in 1991 at Periscope and Platinum Studios in Melbourne. Russell "Rusty" Berther (Rich's brother) from Australian comedy duo, Scared Weird Little Guys, co-wrote 'Headbanger - I Luv U' with Rich and J Bowers. The two bonus tracks, originally released on a 7" single, "Joe Cool" in June 1990, were produced by Kevin "Caveman" Shirley and were recorded at Sing Sing Studios in Melbourne.

References

External links
 Anne McCue Official Site
 Sherry Rich Official Site

1992 albums
Girl Monstar albums